Kapurpur is a village in Sialkot District in the province of Punjab in Pakistan.

References

Villages in Sialkot District